The party of Internet DEmocracy (Hungarian: Internetes DEmokrácia pártja. Abbreviated IDE) was a Hungarian political party, which was established at 23 July 2004 in Gyöngyös.

See also 
Direct democracy
Indirect democracy
E-democracy
Electronic voting

References

External links
IDE’s official homepage (Hungarian)
Bíróság.hu "Court.hu" and its search engine for the official entries of the organisations. (Hungarian)
Hungary's 'Internet Democracy' party takes on Web by EurActive (English)

Defunct political parties in Hungary
Political parties established in 2004
Political parties disestablished in 2010
Democracy
2004 establishments in Hungary
2010 disestablishments in Hungary